Otospermum is a genus of flowering plants in the chamomile tribe within the daisy family.

Species
The only known species is Otospermum glabrum, native to France, Spain, Portugal, Morocco, Algeria, Tunisia, and Libya.

References

Anthemideae
Monotypic Asteraceae genera